Bowring Park may refer to:

Bowring Park (St. John's)
Bowring Park, Knowsley
Bowring Park, Merseyside